The Rural Municipality of Snipe Lake No. 259 is a rural municipality (RM) in the Canadian province of Saskatchewan within Census Division No. 8 and  Division No. 3.

History 
The RM of Snipe Lake No. 259 incorporated as a rural municipality on December 11, 1911.

Geography

Communities and localities 
The following urban municipalities are surrounded by the RM.

Towns
 Eston

The following unincorporated communities are within the RM.

Localities
 Bickleigh
 Isham
 McMorran
 Penkill
 Plato, dissolved as a village, March 28, 1995.
 Richlea, dissolved as a village, December 31, 1958
 Snipe Lake
 Totnes
 Witley

Climate

Eston Riverside Regional Park 
Access to the park is from Highway 30.

Eston Riverside Park has a campground, cabins, a golf course, ball diamonds, an outdoor swimming pool, and access to the river. The campground has 48 campsites, 18 of which are full service.

Eston Riverside Golf Course is a 9-hole, grass greens course. The course is a par 36 with two sets of tees, one totally 3,341 yards and the other 2,605 yards. There is a licensed clubhouse, driving range, and putting green.

Demographics 

Government 
The RM of Snipe Lake No. 259 is governed by an elected municipal council and an appointed administrator that meets on the second Thursday of every month. The reeve of the RM is Bill Owens while its administrator is Brian Shauf. The RM's office is located in Eston.

See also 
List of rural municipalities in Saskatchewan

References 

Snipe Lake